Silvio Gabriel Torales Castillo (born 23 September 1991) is a Paraguayan international footballer who plays for River Plate Asunción as a central midfielder.

Career
Torales began his career with Nacional in. He moved to Mexican club Pumas UNAM in January 2015.

After one year he returned to his country to play for Cerro Porteño on loan on 5 January 2016.

He made his international debut for Paraguay in 2011.

References

1991 births
Living people
Paraguayan footballers
Paraguay international footballers
Association football midfielders
Club Nacional footballers
Cerro Porteño players
Club Universidad Nacional footballers
River Plate (Asunción) footballers
Paraguayan Primera División players
Paraguayan expatriate footballers
Paraguayan expatriate sportspeople in Mexico
Expatriate footballers in Mexico
Liga MX players